The 1947–48 AHL season was the 12th season of the American Hockey League. Eleven teams played 68 games each in the schedule. The Cleveland Barons won their sixth F. G. "Teddy" Oke Trophy as West Division champions, and won their fourth Calder Cup as league champions.

It was the first season, the AHL awarded individual trophies for players. The awards would be, the Les Cunningham Award for the league's "most valuable player," the Wally Kilrea Trophy for the league's "top point scorer," the Dudley "Red" Garrett Memorial Award" for the league's rookie of the year," and the Harry "Hap" Holmes Memorial Award for the goaltender with the "lowest Goals against average" in the league.

Team changes
 The Washington Lions resume operations, playing in the East Division.

Final standings
Note: GP = Games played; W = Wins; L = Losses; T = Ties; GF = Goals for; GA = Goals against; Pts = Points;

Scoring leaders

Note: GP = Games played; G = Goals; A = Assists; Pts = Points; PIM = Penalty minutes

 complete list

Calder Cup playoffs

Trophy and Award winners
Team Awards

Individual Awards

See also
List of AHL seasons

References
AHL official site
AHL Hall of Fame
HockeyDB

American Hockey League seasons
2